Jovin or Joveyn or Jowin or Jowain may refer to:

Jovin, Qazvin
Jovin, Semnan
Joveyn County, in Razavi Khorasan Province

See also
Bala Jowayin Rural District
Miyan Jovin Rural District
Pain Jovin Rural District